This article lists the presidential nominating conventions of the United States Whig Party between 1839 and 1856. Note: Conventions whose nominees won the subsequent presidential election are in bold

aFillmore and Donelson had previously been nominated as candidates of the American Party.

See also
List of presidential nominating conventions in the United States
List of Republican National Conventions
List of Democratic National Conventions
List of United States National Republican/Whig Party presidential tickets
1831 National Republican National Convention

References

Cluskey, Michael W. (ed.). The Political Textbook. J.B. Smith & co., Philadelphia: 1860. Google Books digitized version

Conventions